Cavusgnathidae is an extinct family of conodonts in the order Ozarkodinida.

Genera
Genera are,
 †Adetognathus
 †Cavusgnathus
 †Clydagnathus
 †Ferganaegnathodus
 †Neolochriea
 †Patrognathus
 †Pseudopolygnathus
 †Rhachistognathus
 †Scaphignathus
 †Taphrognathus
 †Weyerognathus

References

External links 

 
 

Ozarkodinida families